There have been two baronetcies created for persons with the surname Bethune, one in the Baronetage of Nova Scotia and one in the Baronetage of the United Kingdom.

The Sharp, later Bethune Baronetcy, of Scotscraig in the County of Fife, was created in the Baronetage of Nova Scotia on 21 April 1683 for William Sharp. The sixth Baronet married Margaret, daughter of John Bethune. The baronetcy became dormant on his death in 1780. It remained so until 1916 when it was successfully claimed by Alexander Sharp Bethune, the ninth Baronet, who had assumed the additional surname of Sharp. He was the grandson of Lieutenant-General Alexander Sharp, de jure seventh Baronet, who assumed the surname of Bethune in lieu of Sharp in 1815. The title became extinct on the death of the tenth Baronet in 1997.

The Bethune Baronetcy, of Kilconquhar in the County of Fife, was created in the Baronetage of the United Kingdom on 7 March 1836. For more information on this creation, see the Earl of Lindsay.

Sharp, later Bethune baronets, of Scotscraig (1683)

Sir William Sharp, 1st Baronet (–1712)
Sir James Sharp, 2nd Baronet (died 1738)
Sir James Sharp, 3rd Baronet (died c. 1748)
Sir William Sharp, 4th Baronet (c. 1754)
Sir Alexander Sharp, 5th Baronet (died c. 1770)
Sir William Sharp, 6th Baronet (1729–1780) (dormant)
Sir Alexander Sharp Bethune, de jure 7th Baronet (1771–1847)
Sir Alexander Bethune, de jure 8th Baronet (1824–1900)
Sir Alexander Sharp Bethune, 9th Baronet (1860–1917) (revived 1916)
Sir Alexander Maitland Sharp Bethune, 10th Baronet (1909–1997)

Bethune baronets, of Kilconquhar (1836)
see the Earl of Lindsay

References
Kidd, Charles, Williamson, David (editors). Debrett's Peerage and Baronetage (1990 edition). New York: St Martin's Press, 1990.

Extinct baronetcies in the Baronetage of Nova Scotia
Extinct baronetcies in the Baronetage of the United Kingdom